Quta K'uchu (Aymara quta lake, k'uchu, q'uch'u corner, "lake corner", also spelled Khota Khuchu, Kkota Khuchu) is a mountain in the La Paz Department in the Andes of Bolivia which reaches a height of approximately . It is located in the Loayza Province, in the southeast of the Malla Municipality. Quta K'uchu lies southwest of Kimsa Willk'i.

References 

Mountains of La Paz Department (Bolivia)